Bradford Simpson is an American film and television producer and partner at Los Angeles-based film studio Color Force.

Life and career
Simpson grew up in Little Rock, Arkansas, and graduated from Brown University.

He began his career at Killer Films, where he served as an executive and a producer. At Killer Films he co-produced Far from Heaven, Party Monster and A Home at the End of the World, and served as associate producer on Boys Don't Cry and Camp. He was also involved with independent films such as Velvet Goldmine, Hedwig and the Angry Inch, Happiness, and One Hour Photo.

From 2004 to 2007, Simpson served as President of Appian Way Productions, Leonardo DiCaprio's Warner Bros-based production company.

Simpson served as executive producer of Marc Forster's films Machine Gun Preacher in 2011 and World War Z in 2013. He also produced Diary of a Wimpy Kid, Diary of a Wimpy Kid: Rodrick Rules and Diary of a Wimpy Kid: Dog Days along with future producing partner, Nina Jacobson.

Color Force
In 2012, he joined Color Force as a partner. Later that year, Simpson and Nina Jacobson signed a first-look deal with FX Productions for original programs.

In 2016, FX aired The People v. O. J. Simpson: American Crime Story, produced by Color Force. Simpson won an Emmy Award for his work on the series the same year, as well as a Golden Globe. Simpson also won a BAFTA, a Critics' Choice award, a TCA award, and a Producers Guild of America award.

In 2016, FX Productions signed Simpson and Jacobson to an exclusive production deal for original programming.

In 2018, Simpson produced the second American Crime Story series, The Assassination of Gianni Versace: American Crime Story. For his work on The Assassination of Gianni Versace, Simpson received an Emmy award, a Golden Globe award, a Critics' Choice award, a TCA award, and a Producers Guild award. The same year, Simpson served as an executive producer on the FX series Pose.

Simpson produced Crazy Rich Asians and Ben Is Back with Jacobson in 2018.

He executive produced Richard Linklater's Where'd You Go, Bernadette (2019). Simpson is executive producing The Goldfinch, an adaptation of Donna Tart's novel of the same name, and will serve as one of the executive producers on the television adaptation of Y: The Last Man for FX.

Filmography
He was producer for all films unless otherwise noted.

Film

Miscellaneous crew

Thanks

Television

References

External links

Year of birth missing (living people)
Living people
American film producers
American television producers
Brown University alumni
Emmy Award winners
People from Little Rock, Arkansas